Max Harris may refer to:

Max Harris (composer) (1918–2004), British composer of film and television music
Max Harris (cricketer) (born 2001), English cricketer
Max Harris (footballer) (born 1999), English footballer
Max Harris (golfer) (born 1978), English golfer
Max Harris (poet) (1921–1995), Australian poet, critic and bookseller

See also
Maxwell S. Harris (1876–1933), American lawyer and politician